The Dancer's Body, a series of three documentary programmes exploring the science and the art of dance, was first broadcast by the BBC in 2002. The series was an experiment in "cross-genre" television production, intended to break down conventional barriers between the arts, medicine, science, factual and entertainment programming. It was presented by the former principal dancer of the Royal Ballet School in London, Deborah Bull, and won the International Dance Screen Award in the same year.

Recent developments in brain science, psychology, physical medicine and nutrition, and their relevance to dance, were combined with performances, by Deborah Bull and other dancers, of works specially commissioned for the series from leading choreographers, including David Bintley and Wayne McGregor.

Bull introduced an autobiographical element to the series by returning to Skegness, where, aged seven, she took her first lessons at the Janice Sutton School of Dance, in a room above what is now an amusement arcade on the town's High Street. One of Janice Sutton's current pupils, seven-year-old Rebecca Ellis, danced  a simple routine to illustrate how the future prima ballerina might have performed at the same age.

The executive producer of the series was Ross MacGibbon; the series producer was Robert Eagle. The directors included Andy King-Dabbs, Diana Hill and Deborah May.

References

External links

Documentary films about ballet
BBC television documentaries
2002 British television series debuts
2002 British television series endings
2000s British documentary television series
2000s British television miniseries
English-language television shows